Taisto Reimaluoto (born 28 September 1961, in Helsinki) is a Finnish actor.

Reimaluoto began his career in films and in 1994, he appeared in Aapo as the lead character.

However since 1995 he has become a prolific Finnish television actor only appearing in several films such as Ambush (known as Rukajärven tie in Finland) in 1999.

External links

1961 births
Living people
Male actors from Helsinki
Finnish male television actors